"Abbottabad" is a poem by Major James Abbott (1807–1896), who wrote the work about his experience of living in the area before leaving it. He was impressed by beauty of the area. The Pakistani city Abbottabad, which he founded (then capital of the Hazara District of British India), is named after him. A plaque commemorating his poem is displayed at Lady Garden Park within the city. The poem has been criticised as being poorly written, in the manner of William McGonagall's substandard verse.

Poem text
I remember the day when I first came here
  And smelt the sweet Abbottabad's air
The trees and the ground covered with snow
  Gave us indeed a brilliant show
To me the place seemed like a dream
  And far ran a lonesome stream
The wind hissed as if welcoming us
  The pine swayed creating a lot of fuss
And the tiny cuckoo sang it away
  A song very melodious and gay
I adored the place from the first sight
  And was happy that my coming here was right
And eight good years here passed very soon
  And we leave you perhaps on a sunny noon
Oh Abbottabad we are leaving you now
  To your natural beauty do I bow
Perhaps your winds sound will never reach my ear
  My gift for you is few sad tears
I bid you farewell with a heavy heart
  Never from my mind will your memories thwart

Criticism
An article by Stephen Moss of the Guardian newspaper refers to the poem as "one of the worst poems ever written". Moss speculates that the poem may sound better in Urdu and he did not read a translation. Moss also states that the version he read includes "oddly garbled" phrases which indicate it may be a badly translated form of the original.

References

English poems
Pakistani poems
Poems